Parimatch is an international sports betting company in Europe with headquarters in Limassol, Cyprus, founded in 1994.

History

Parimatch was established in 1994 in Kyiv, Ukraine. The company entered the Russian market in 1998. The online betting website was launched in 2000 and was one the first among bookmakers in the CIS region. In September 2015, Parimatch entered the Kazakhstan market and began cooperation with Federbet to prevent match fixing. In 2018, the company began operations in Tanzania and Cyprus. In December 2018, Parimatch's CEO, Sergey Portnov won 'Leader of the year award' at the SBC Awards held in London. In February 2020, the company joined the Esports Integrity Commission to assist with battling cheating and fraud in esports. In June 2021, Parimatch expanded operations across India. In March 2021, Parimatch became the first betting company in Ukraine to buy a license after a new law regulation was adopted by the local parliament. In December 2021, Parimatch acquired the performance marketing organisation Mr Fish in addition to online poker room PokerMatch.

In March 2022, Parimatch withdrawn the franchise from Russia due to the full-scale military invasion into Ukraine. Following this, in May, Parimatch announced they had organised the Parimatch Foundation and had allocated €510,000 to support the people of Ukraine. The foundation while originally set up for educational and sports projects has re-allocated its resources toward helping Ukrainian woman and children during the humanitarian crisis.

In April 2022, Parimatch announced a restructure to their management, appointing Maksym Liashko as the new CEO of the organisation as Roman Syrotian (former CEO) stepped into a supervisory role.

In May 2022, Parimatch continued with the companies plan for international expansion via opening a new European hub in Prague. Additionally, the new office gave the opportunity to provide a working environment for the company employees from the Ukraine. The previous company R&D centre was in Kyiv but has been relocated for safety reasons due to military activity around the capital.

License
Parimatch operates under local licenses issued by the regulatory authorities of each country in Cyprus, Kazakhstan, Tajikistan and Tanzania. Parimatch brand was represented in Russia and Belarus, but in 2022 the brand announced withdrawal the local franchises due to the full-scale military invasion into Ukraine.

The company also carries out its activity under the international license of self-governing territory Curaçao (eGaming).

On October 1, 2020, Parimatch launched into the UK market with their website being run by BV Gaming Limited.

References

Bookmakers
Companies based in Limassol
Companies established in 1994